Nyamal is an Australian Aboriginal language spoken by the Nyamal people in the Pilbara region of Western Australia.

References

Ngayarda languages